Pajat or Pajet may refer to:
 Pajat, Kohgiluyeh and Boyer-Ahmad (پاجات - Pājāt)
 Pajat, Mazandaran (پجت - Pajat)
 Pajat, Behshahr, Mazandaran Province (پجت - Pajat)